IEEE 802.11ah is a wireless networking protocol published in 2017 called Wi-Fi HaLow (pronounced "HEY-Low") as an amendment of the IEEE 802.11-2007 wireless networking standard. It uses 900 MHz license-exempt bands to provide extended-range Wi-Fi networks, compared to conventional Wi-Fi networks operating in the 2.4 GHz and 5 GHz bands. It also benefits from lower energy consumption, allowing the creation of large groups of stations or sensors that cooperate to share signals, supporting the concept of the Internet of things (IoT). The protocol's low power consumption competes with Bluetooth, LoRa, and Zigbee, and has the added benefit of higher data rates and wider coverage range.

Description 
A benefit of 802.11ah is extended range, making it useful for rural communications and offloading cell phone tower traffic.  The other purpose of the protocol is to allow low rate 802.11 wireless stations to be used in the sub-gigahertz spectrum.  The protocol is one of the IEEE 802.11 technologies which is the most different from the LAN model, especially concerning medium contention.  A prominent aspect of 802.11ah is the behavior of stations that are grouped to minimize contention on the air media, use relay to extend their reach, use little power thanks to predefined wake/doze periods, are still able to send data at high speed under some negotiated conditions and use sectored antennas. It uses the 802.11a/g specification that is down sampled to provide 26 channels, each of them able to provide 100 kbit/s throughput. It can cover a one-kilometer radius. It aims at providing connectivity to thousands of devices under an access point. The protocol supports machine to machine (M2M) markets, like smart metering.

Data rates 
Data rates up to 347 Mbit/s are achieved only with the maximum of four spatial streams using one 16 MHz-wide channel. Various modulation schemes and coding rates are defined by the standard and are represented by a Modulation and Coding Scheme (MCS) index value. The table below shows the relationships between the variables that allow for the maximum data rate. GI (Guard Interval) : Timing between symbols.

2 MHz channel uses an FFT of 64, of which: 56 OFDM subcarriers, 52 are for data and 4 are pilot tones with a carrier separation of 31.25 kHz (2 MHz/64) (32 µs). Each of these subcarriers can be a BPSK, QPSK, 16-QAM, 64-QAM or 256-QAM. The total bandwidth is 2 MHz with an occupied bandwidth of 1.78 MHz. Total symbol duration is 36 or 40 microseconds, which includes a guard interval of 4 or 8 microseconds.

MAC Features

Relay Access Point 
A Relay Access Point (AP) is an entity that logically consists of a Relay and a networking station (STA), or client. The relay function allows an AP and stations to exchange frames with one another by the way of a relay. The introduction of a relay allows stations to use higher MCSs (Modulation and Coding Schemes) and reduce the time stations will stay in Active mode. This improves battery life of stations. Relay stations may also provide connectivity for stations located outside the coverage of the AP. There is an overhead cost on overall network efficiency and increased complexity with the use of relay stations. To limit this overhead, the relaying function shall be bi-directional and limited to two hops only.

Power saving 
Power-saving stations are divided into two classes: TIM stations and non-TIM stations. TIM stations periodically receive information about traffic buffered for them from the access point in the so-called TIM information element, hence the name. Non-TIM stations use the new Target Wake Time mechanism which enables reducing signaling overhead.

Target Wake Time 
Target Wake Time (TWT) is a function that permits an AP to define a specific time or set of times for individual stations to access the medium. The STA (client) and the AP exchange information that includes an expected activity duration to allow the AP to control the amount of contention and overlap among competing STAs. The AP can protect the expected duration of activity with various protection mechanisms. The use of TWT is negotiated between an AP and an STA. Target Wake Time may be used to reduce network energy consumption, as stations that use it can enter a doze state until their TWT arrives.

Restricted Access Window 
Restricted Access Window allows partitioning of the stations within a Basic Service Set (BSS) into groups and restricting channel access only to stations belonging to a given group at any given time period. It helps to reduce contention and to avoid simultaneous transmissions from a large number of stations hidden from each other.

Bi Directional TXOP 
Bi Directional TXOP allows an AP and non-AP (STA or client) to exchange a sequence of uplink and downlink frames during a reserved time (transmit opportunity or TXOP). This operation mode is intended to reduce the number of contention-based channel accesses, improve channel efficiency by minimizing the number of frame exchanges required for uplink and downlink data frames, and enable stations to extend battery lifetime by keeping Awake times short. This continuous frame exchange is done both uplink and downlink between the pair of stations. In earlier versions of the standard Bi Directional TXOP was called Speed Frame Exchange.

Sectorization 
The partition of the coverage area of a Basic Service Set (BSS) into sectors, each containing a subset of stations, is called sectorization. This partitioning is achieved through a set of antennas or a set of synthesized antenna beams to cover different sectors of the BSS. The goal of the sectorization is to reduce medium contention or interference by the reduced number of stations within a sector and/or to allow spatial sharing among overlapping BSS (OBSS) APs or stations.

Comparison with 802.11af 
Another WLAN standard for sub-1 GHz bands is IEEE 802.11af which, unlike 802.11ah, operates in licensed bands. More specifically, 802.11af operates in the TV white space spectrum in the VHF and UHF bands between 54 and 790 MHz using cognitive radio technology.

IEEE 802.11 network standards

See also 
 Classic WaveLAN (pre-802.11 hardware with a 915 MHz variant)
 DASH7
 IEEE
 LoRa another low power long range wireless communication technology

Notes

References

Bibliography 

 
 
 
 
 

ah